Saskatchewan Rivers is a provincial electoral district for the Legislative Assembly of Saskatchewan, Canada. This constituency is located where the North Saskatchewan River and the South Saskatchewan River merge.

Communities in the riding include the towns of Big River and Choiceland; and the villages of White Fox, Debden, Meath Park, Candle Lake, Smeaton, and Christopher Lake.

Members of the Legislative Assembly

The district has elected the following MLAs:

Election results

|-

 
|NDP
|Jeanette Wicinski-Dunn
|align="right"|2,247
|align="right"|31.19
|align="right"|-10.00

|- bgcolor="white"
!align="left" colspan=3|Total
!align="right"|7,204
!align="right"|100.00%
!align="right"|

|-

 
|NDP
|Lon Borgerson
|align="right"|3,221
|align="right"|41.19
|align="right"|-6.46

|- bgcolor="white"
!align="left" colspan=3|Total
!align="right"|7,819
!align="right"|100.00%
!align="right"|

|-
 
| style="width: 130px" |NDP
|Lon Borgerson
|align="right"|3,446
|align="right"|47.65
|align="right"|+5.07

|- bgcolor="white"
!align="left" colspan=3|Total
!align="right"|7,232
!align="right"|100.00%
!align="right"|

|-

 
|NDP
|Jack Langford
|align="right"|2,892
|align="right"|42.58
|align="right"|-4.81

|- bgcolor="white"
!align="left" colspan=3|Total
!align="right"|6,792
!align="right"|100.00%
!align="right"|

|-
 
| style="width: 130px" |NDP
|Jack Langford
|align="right"|3,199
|align="right"|47.39
|align="right"|*

 
|Prog. Conservative
|Albert H. Provost
|align="right"|1,373
|align="right"|20.34
|align="right"|*
|- bgcolor="white"
!align="left" colspan=3|Total
!align="right"|6,750
!align="right"|100.00%
!align="right"|

References

External links 
Website of the Legislative Assembly of Saskatchewan
Saskatchewan Archives Board – Saskatchewan Election Results By Electoral Division

Saskatchewan provincial electoral districts